Zeaxanthin 7,8-dioxygenase (zeaxanthin 7,8(7',8')-cleavage dioxygenase, CsZCD) is an enzyme with systematic name zeaxanthin:oxygen oxidoreductase (7,8-cleaving). This enzyme catalyses the following chemical reaction

 zeaxanthin + 2 O2  crocetin dialdehyde + 2 (3S)-3-hydroxycyclocitral

Zeaxanthin 7,8-dioxygenase acts twice on zeaxanthin cleaving 3-hydroxycyclocitral off each 3-hydroxy end group.

References

External links 
 

EC 1.14.99